John de Holcroft (fl. 1373–1383) was an English politician.

He was a Member (MP) of the Parliament of England for Lancashire in 1373 and October 1383.

References

Year of birth missing
Year of death missing
English MPs 1373
English MPs October 1383
Members of the Parliament of England (pre-1707) for Lancashire